Fudbalski klub Velež Mostar (English: Football club Velež Mostar) is a professional football club based in Mostar, Bosnia and Herzegovina. The club has a history of being one of the most successful clubs from Bosnia and Herzegovina. It was founded on 26 June 1922. The club currently plays at Rođeni Stadium (7,000 capacity), but its historic stadium is the Bijeli Brijeg (9,000 capacity). Due to the divisions between Bosniak and Croat territories, Velež lost its previous home ground of Bijeli Brijeg. That stadium was largely used by Velež during the glory days of the club, when they triumphed in the 1981 and 1986 Yugoslav Cups. The club also reached the quarter-final stage of the 1974–75 UEFA Cup.

The club is named after a nearby mountain Velež, which in itself is named after one of the old Slavic gods, Veles.

During the time of former Yugoslavia, Velež was always in the Yugoslav First League and the team often ended the season in the top ten. Velež was the most popular and most successful team from Herzegovina to play in the top Yugoslav League. The team was very popular in Herzegovina, but also had fans all over Yugoslavia, and had a mixture of fans from all three main ethnic groups.

Today, Velež is in the Football Association of Bosnia and Herzegovina and is active in the Premier League of Bosnia and Herzegovina and regardless of the difficult and divisive political situation, still has a mixture of fans from all three main ethnic groups. The team was relegated to the First League of the Federation from the Premier League. However, Velež was promoted to the top league of the country in 2019.

In the summer of 2005, the club's assembly returned the five-pointed red star, also known as the petokraka, to their logo. The red star has been the symbol of the club since its founding in 1922.

History

Before World War II (1922–1941)
On 26 June 1922, in a suburb of Mostar called Sjeverni logor, Velež Mostar were founded with the prefix RŠD (Radnički Športski Klub) or Workers' Sports Club. There were many suggestions for the name, however according to an urban legend the name Velež was picked due to the nearby mountain, as there was nothing higher. Velež's first kits were black and white due to destitution and poverty. Velež only started playing in red after a board member named Vaso Pucarić brought them from Zagreb. Velež's first derby with an older club from Mostar, Zrinjski was canceled after Zrinjski's players wanted Velež's players to take off the red stars from their kits and Velež refused to do so. The club was sympathetic to worker's rights and socialism, which made it a big target from the Kingdom of Yugoslavia, who frequently harassed players and supporters. Before the war there existed a league for clubs within the city: Velež, Zrinjski, SK Vardar and the JSK (Jugoslovenski sportski klub). Velež had won this competition twice in the 1929 and 1930 seasons. At one point during this time 3,500 people were members of Velež. On 1 September 1940 Velež played a friendly versus a team from Podgorica called Crna Gora. After the game players and those in attendance started a protest against the Yugoslav government on the streets of Mostar. Police shot at demonstrators and in 2 days the club was banned. During the Second World War many members of Velež joined the Yugoslav Partisans and 77 footballers from Velež were said to have lost their lives during the war. 9 players were awarded the Order of the People's Hero award by the new socialist government, 8 of which posthumously. The only living player given the medal was former captain Mehmed Trbonja.

Velež in SFR Yugoslavia (1945–1992)

Early days in the top flight (1945–1968)

After the war ended, the new socialist government banned clubs that participated in football tournaments organized by the Independent State of Croatia, including Zrinjski. Vardar and JSK also disbanded, which left Velež as the only active football club in Mostar, a city of 48,000 people by 1948. Before the war, all teams in Mostar played in Sjeverni logor, which was technically owned by JSK. The stadium was in bad shape, there was no boundary between the pitch and the stands and one newspaper outlet said it should be banned to play games in Mostar. In response the city council decided to build a modern stadium for the time in the Bijeli Brijeg suburb; equipped with a training ground, locker rooms and offices for club officials. Between 1947 and 1956 construction was made possible by youth work actions, with some involvement from unions and independent firms. Work stopped at various intervals due to lack of mechanization, but from June 1956 onwards resources that were necessary for completion were given and development of the stadium finished much faster. On 7 September 1958 Velež played their first ever game at the Bijeli Brijeg stadium: a 2–1 victory versus FK Željezničar.

In the 1952–53 season for the first time ever, Velež appeared in the top flight of any league but were relegated. Velež's top scorers were Vladimir Zelenika with 9 goals in 11 games and captain Haldun Hrvić with 7 goals in 22 games. After 2 seasons in the second tier Velež were promoted and competed in the 1955–56 Yugoslav First League where they finished seventh out of 14 teams. For the duration of the entire Yugoslav First League Velež were never relegated again. During the early days of Velež in the top flight, one of the most well respected players was Muhamed Mujić, who played over 400 games and was joint top scorer for the 1955–56 season. Because of this he became Velež's first player to receive a call up to the SFR Yugoslavia national football team versus Hungary in 1956. He scored 17 goals in 32 appearances, played in Melbourne for the 1956 Olympics and in Chile for the 1962 World Cup but his career with the national team ended abruptly after a bad foul on Soviet player Eduard Dubinski, which indirectly caused Dubinski's death 7 years later. The Yugoslav Football Association sent Mujić back home and he never played another international game again.

In the 1957–58 Yugoslav Cup, Velež became the first Bosnian team to reach the final, after beating Radnički Beograd, RNK Split and Hajduk Split in previous rounds. In front of a crowd of 30,000 at the Stadion JNA, Velež lost 4–0 after a lacklustre performance that served more as Rajko Mitić's farewell game than a cup final.

Sulejman Sula Rebac becomes manager (1968–1976)

In 1968, former player Sulejman "Sula" Rebac who had played over 500 games for Velež became manager. At this point, Velež were a steady midtable-team in the first division however under the guidance of Rebac Velež would experience a meteoric rise that culminated in reaching the UEFA cup quarterfinals. His first full season in 1968–69 saw an 8th-place finish in which the main focus was Rebac successfully utilizing Velež's youth team, a tradition Velež held right up until the Bosnian War. The first players to come through the academy were goalkeeper Enver Marić and striker Dušan Bajević. They and midfielder Franjo Vladić would make up the famous BMV trio (named after the German car manufacturer) which was one of the most prolific partnerships in the history of Bosnian football. The 1969–70 saw Velež finish third and Bajević joint top scorer alongside Slobodan Santrač with 20 goals each. 1970 also saw Bajević's first call-up to the national team, a 1–1 draw versus Austria in which he scored on his debut. Bajević would go on to make 37 appearances and score 29 goals, including a hat-trick against Zaire in a 9–0 demolition during the 1974 World Cup. In the 1972–73 Velež placed 2nd in the league, their best position yet and qualified for the UEFA cup, their first ever European competition. They were knocked out in the first round to Tatran Prešov.

The 1973–74 season was one of Velež's best. In the league, Velež were in a neck and neck race with Hajduk Split. After the 32nd and 33rd round, Hajduk and Velež had the same number of points; with Hajduk having the better goal difference. On the final day of the season, both won their games and Hajduk won the league on account of goal difference. In Europe the following season, Velež won on away goals against Spartak Moscow in the first round and against Rapid Wien in the second round. In the third round they were faced with Derby County, who would go on to win the First Division that season. They lost 3–1 in the first leg at the Baseball Ground. Franjo Vladić scored Velež's only goal that day. The second leg at the Bijeli Brijeg stadium featured a remarkable upset. Boro Primorac, another prodigy of Rebac, scored in the 14th minute with a follow up goal from Vladimir Pecelj in the 29th minute. Vladić scored in the 51st minute and Velež had a 4–3 lead. Kevin Hector scored for Derby in the 75th minute and the aggregate was tied at 4–4. In the 85th minute Velež were awarded a penalty which Dušan Bajević scored. The game ended 5–4 on aggregate and Velež went on to the quarterfinals. There they faced FC Twente, and lost 2–1 on aggregate. After the UEFA Cup run, Rebac resigned, while the core of the team was also leaving. Marić left for Schalke 04 in 1976, Bajević left to join AEK Athens in 1977, with Vladić following him in 1979.

Rebuilding and first trophies (1976–1992)

With the trio that Velež had depended upon now missing, the rest of Velež's squad now had a chance to shine: Džemal Hadžiabdić, his younger brother Mili, Marko Čolić, Vladimir Pecelj, Jadranko Topić, Blaž Slišković but none were an integral part of post-BMV Velež more than Vahid Halilhodžić. He scored 253 goals in 376 matches and solidified himself as one of Velež's best ever players. During the 1976 transfer window he was a keen transfer target for many important Yugoslav clubs including Partizan, Dinamo Zagreb and Red Star Belgrade because of his performances for the national team, but ultimately stayed at Velež. The act did not pay off as Velež finished 11th, miles off pace compared to the clubs trying to buy Halilhodžić. The next 2 seasons saw some improvement, finishing 7th and 5th, respectively. In the 1979–80 season, Velež finished 8th and the manager at the time, Vukašin Višnjevac was sacked and replaced with Miloš Milutinović, famously known as Plava čigra.

In the league Velež finished a lowly 9th place, but their real shining moment came in the cup that season. Velež had beaten Borac Banja Luka in the first round 3–2, and after a walkover from Sutjeska Nikšić in the second round, advanced to the quarterfinals where they faced FK Bregalnica Štip, a lower league side from North Macedonia, and beat them 2–0. Velež beat Budućnost Podgorica 2–1 in the semi-final and ensured that they would be in the cup final for the first time in 23 years. Their opponents were Željezničar Sarajevo, who had finished 14th the same season. This tie resulted in the first and only ever all-Bosnian final in the Yugoslav Cup. Halilhodžić had signed a contract with French side FC Nantes and would leave Velež after the final, no matter the result, but the game was praised for being one of his finest hours for Velež. After joining Nantes he became one of their most iconic and legendary players and would go on to manage them in 2018. In the cup final, the first goal came in the 36th minute after a penalty was given to Željezničar. Mehmed Baždarević scored and by the end of the first half the score remained 1–0 to Željezničar. Halilhodžić scored a brace in the space of 3 minutes and Velež were in the lead. In the 62nd minute another penalty was called for Željezničar, which Baždarević converted again. Dragan Okuka scored the winning goal with a header in the 80th minute, and Velež won their first ever major trophy.

As a result of winning they were admitted into the Cup Winners' Cup, and played their first game in Europe in 6 years. They also took part in the 1980–81 Balkans Cup, which they won 12–7 on aggregate against Trakia Plovdiv, later Botev Plovdiv. In the 1981–82 Cup Winners' Cup beat Jeunesse Esch 7–2 on aggregate in the first round and faced Lokomotiv Leipzig in the second, which they lost on penalties. The 1981–82 league season saw Velež finish 7th and Milutinović left for FK Partizan. Without him, Velež struggled and finished 13th, even with the efforts of Vladimir Skočajić (14 goals) and Dušan Bajević (11 goals). Bajević eventually became manager in 1984. In the 1984–85 season Velež finished 11th but the next season saw a huge improvement, with Velež finishing 3rd, their best season since 1973–74. This was largely due to the efforts of a new golden generation including goalkeeper Vukašin Petranović, defenders Nenad Bijedić and Vladimir Matijević, midfielder Vladimir Skočajić and forwards Predrag Jurić, Sead Kajtaz and Semir Tuce.

Velež had another good cup run in the 1985-86 Yugoslav Cup, first beating lower league Željezničar Doboj 1–5 away from home. Rad from Belgrade were beaten 2–0 but in the quarterfinals faced tough opponents Partizan. Velež fielded an upset winning 5–3 on penalties after the game ended 1–1 in normal time. In the semi-finals Velež faced yet another team from Belgrade, this time OFK Belgrade, which Velež beat 3–0 at home. In the final they were faced with Dinamo Zagreb, one of the big 4 teams in Yugoslavia led by famous coach Miroslav "Ćiro" Blažević. Nenad Bijedić scored a penalty in the sixth minute with an additional goal in the 51st minute. Marko Mlinarić of Dinamo quickly scored in the 58th minute, but the final score was settled after Predrag Jurić scored in the 87th minute. The performance of Velež was so good it caught the eye of the new Yugoslavia national team coach, Ivica Osim who was the manager of Željezničar during the 1981 cup final. Predrag Jurić was capped twice following the final and Semir Tuce was capped 7 times and scored 2 goals. Them and Meho Kodro, who was a youth prospect in 1986 would be the last players to play for the Yugoslavia national team while playing for Velež.

Velež had a fantastic performance in the league that season as well, but it was marred by the final matchday. Velež lost 2–3 to OFK Belgrade at home and it was suspected that Velež, along with 13 other teams that day was suspected of match fixing. The claim for Velež's game was that Velež had confirmed themselves a place in the UEFA Cup next season (but played in the Cup Winners' Cup instead) but OFK needed a win to stay up. They were deducted 6 points the following season but come the end of the season the deduction would be overturned.

Velež got to participate in the Cup Winners' Cup again and beat Vasas SC in the first round with a 5–4 aggregate victory but lost versus Vitosha Sofia (later Levski Sofia) with the same aggregate. In the league Velež originally finished 3rd again however courts rejected that any matchfixing took place on the final day of the season. As charges were dropped Velež's 6-point deduction would be overturned and finished 2nd instead. This would be the last time Velež finished 2nd in the top flight. They beat FC Sion of Switzerland in the first round 5–3 on aggregate in the UEFA cup first round. Their next opponent would be West German powerhouse Borussia Dortmund. Reinhard Saftig, Dortmund's coach at the time decided to watch Velež play live before the game. The game was a 5–0 victory over Red Star Belgrade which is still regarded as a memorable victory by many Velež fans. Velež ended up losing 2–0 away in the first leg however the second leg would be one of Velež's most famous victories. Meho Kodro and Predrag Jurić both scored goals, Semir Tuce missed a penalty, but Frank Mill scored for Dortmund and ended any chance of Velež going through with 3–2 on aggregate for Dortmund and 2–1 only counting the game played at the Bijeli Brijeg Stadium. For the 1988–89 season Velež played their ever last season in a European competition (namely the UEFA Cup). They beat APOEL 6–2 on aggregate in the first round and Belenenses 4–3 on penalties after 0–0 on aggregate in the second round. In the third round they were faced with Hearts of Midlothian. They lost 3–0 in the first leg away and couldn't overturn the deficit with a 2–1 win at home, ending 15 years and 6 seasons in European competitions. In the league Velež finished 11th, their worst position in 5 years. The 1988-89 Yugoslav Cup was also the last time Velež would appear in a cup final. Velež only beat lower league opposition in the previous rounds including Sileks Kratovo, HNK Šibenik, Liria Prizren, and Rudar Ljubija (later Rudar Prijedor). In the final itself Velež were trashed by First League opposition FK Partizan 6–1 with goals from Nebojša Vučićević, Goran Milojević, Fadil Vokrri, Vladimir Vermezović and Zoran Batrović. Velež's sole goal came from Zijad Repak in the 65th minute.

In 1989, Velež's youth team reached the final of the Yugoslav Youth Football Cup for the fourth time (after losing the final in 1969, 1977 and 1987) and won 4–1 versus FK Vardar with a team featuring Franjo Džidić, Slaven Musa and Sergej Barbarez. This would be the only piece of silverware ever won by Velež's youth team.

Velež in an independent Bosnia and Herzegovina (1992–present)

Rebuilding and instability (1992–2006)
On 15 March 1992, Velež would play their last ever game at the Bijeli Brijeg stadium; a 2–0 win versus FK Zemun. Shortly after the game the Siege of Mostar started, rendering football a dangerous and logistically impossible task. Velež were already on the way out of the Yugoslav First League due to Bosnia voting to leave Yugoslavia in an independence referendum at the beginning of the month, and to make matters worse due to Bosnia being independent, the ban on fascist clubs was lifted, which led to Zrinjski being refounded in 1992. After the war, a new municipality within Mostar called Jugozapad (eng. Southwest) awarded the Bijeli Brijeg stadium to Zrinjski, which would lead to controversy for the next few years. Zrinjski had positioned themselves as a club specifically for Croats, which led to a large number of Velež's supporters abandoning them (Velež were a multiethnic club for all of their history, including players of Bosniak, Serb and Croat origin). Velež didn't play another game until 1994, when they were placed in the "Zenica Group" of the 1994–95 First League of Bosnia and Herzegovina, a wartime cuplike competition. Velež lost their first game 3–0 to Slaven Živinice and things didn't improve, they lost their next 2 games and exited the competition along with NK Đerzelez as the only 2 teams who lost all of their games.

For the 1995–96 season which transitioned football in Bosnia to a proper league system (albeit with three leagues competing on ethnic lines) all teams needed to compete on their own stadium. After friendlies in Sjeverni logor and Jablanica Velež chose Vrapčići, on the very outskirts of Mostar. The next few seasons would be rough as Velež finished 14th in 1995–96 and 10th in 1996–97 and 1997–98. For the last season mentioned a playoff system was introduced between the Bosniak and Croat clubs where the best of each league played against each other to determine a true champion in Bosnian football. In 1998–99 Velež pulled off a shock result by qualifying to the playoffs. To mark the occasion Velež demanded to play at the Bijeli Brijeg stadium, however after the Office of the High Representative (OHR) rejected the appeal, Velež and other teams boycotted the playoff for that season. Velež later qualified for the inaugural season of the Premier League of Bosnia and Herzegovina, the first post-war competition not based on ethnic lines where they finished 5th in their first season. The next season saw an 8th-place finish but the 2002–03 season saw a relegation into the second tier for the first time since 1952.

In the second tier Velež were a strong contender for promotion, first in the 2003–04 season, however a goal in injury time for Budućnost Banovići ensured that they would be promoted instead of Velež. In 2004–05 another title challenge was mounted but a 2–1 loss versus Rudar Kakanj made sure Jedinstvo Bihać would get promoted. In 2005–06 Velež were finally promoted, 14 points clear of second placed Rudar Kakanj.

Comeback and collapse (2006–2017)
For the next few seasons Velež would be a consistent midtable team in the Premier League with no major cup runs until the 2011–12 season, when Velež defeated Travnik 3–2 away in the first round and faced local rivals Zrinjski in the next round. The game originally ended 1–0 to Velež when Riad Demić scored in the 93rd minute which resulted in a pitch invasion from Zrinjski fans. This meant the game ended 3–0 to Velež and the Bijeli Brijeg stadium was suspended for 5 games. The second leg ended 2–0 to Velež and they would book themselves a place in the quarterfinals versus HNK Branitelj, which they won 3–1 on aggregate. As a result, Velež appeared in the cup semi-finals for the first time since 1998. They ended up losing 2–0 on aggregate to Široki Brijeg and Velež's best cup run in 15 years was over. In the 2013–14 season Velež finished in 5th place, 3 points away from European football, the highest since the leagues in Bosnia were reunified.

In June 2015, Velež were bought out by president of the Bosnian Social Democratic Party, Nermin Nikšić. Things quickly turned worse as the club failed to organize friendlies, pay player's wages, repeatedly fired coaches and fans got involved in brawls with opposing players. Velež ended the 2015–16 season in last place with only 9 points out of 30 games, which is one of the worst records in any top-flight league. The Nikšić board and subsequent emergency board was eventually replaced by a board led by Šemsudin Hasić, director of local pharmaceutical company Hercegovinalijek. That didn't mean the 2016–17 season started off easy. After 8 games Velež had not won a single game and were in 15th place out of 16 teams. The previous coach Avdo Kalajdžić was sacked and replaced with Ibrahim Rahimić, who had previously played for and coached Velež. Velež miraculously stayed up on the final day of the season and FK Goražde were relegated instead of them. Between seasons the stadium "Vrapčići" changed their name to "Stadion Rođeni" named after fans of Velež.

New comeback (2017–present)

For the 2017–18 season, thanks to new signings such as Elmir Kuduzović, Hamza Mešanović and Minel Doljančić, Velež wrapped up a 3rd place spot.

For the 2018–19 season, Velež signed many attackers like attacking midfielder Edo Vehabović, right winger Obren Cvijanović and striker Nusmir Fajić. The push to more attacking football worked as Velež went the whole first part of the season (15 games) unbeaten and Fajić himself scored 18 goals. Things turned sour after a controversial away game versus Goražde, where multiple refereeing errors lead to Goražde scoring the only goal of the game and Velež losing the unbeaten run record. Multiple former players including Velibor Pudar, Vahid Halilhodžić and Džemal Hadžiabdić expressed support for overturning the result but the FA adopted the original scoreline and 8.0 rating for the referees (7 or lower would mean suspension). Velež overcame this and won the First League 7 points ahead of their nearest rivals Olimpik, who were at one point only 1 point behind Velež. Velež also finished with a record 76 points and Nusmir Fajić scored a record 28 goals in one season. Another record broken that season was the final game played between Velež and Igman Konjic, a match that had an attendance of 7,000, one of the highest in the new stadium.

Velež's return to the top flight was not as glamorous as anticipated as they lost their first three games to Mladost Doboj Kakanj, Zrinjski and Čelik Zenica. Rahimić resigned and Feđa Dudić was chosen as the next manager. His first game featured the debut of Macedonian centre-back Kosta Manev, who was cited as one of Velež's best players that season. Dudić's first game as manager was a 0–0 draw against Sloboda Tuzla and Velež picked up its first point in the season. Velež picked up several wins against teams like Široki Brijeg, Željezničar, Borac Banja Luka and Zrinjski in the rematch later that season. The season would ultimately be abandoned after 22 of the planned 33 games had been played due to the ongoing COVID-19 pandemic in Bosnia and Herzegovina. However, the following season saw Velež's fortune turn with a return to European competition, finishing 3rd in the league and qualifying for the first iteration of the UEFA Europa Conference League. In the Conference League qualifying rounds, Velež eliminated semi-professional Northern Irish club Coleraine and Greek giants AEK Athens, before themselves getting eliminated by Swedish side IF Elfsborg in the third qualifying round. In the 2021–22 season, Velež won the first Bosnian Cup title in their history, after a penalty shoot-out, following a 0–0 draw against Sarajevo.

Following Feđa Dudić leaving Velež at the end of the 2021–22 season, the club appointed Amar Osim, one of the most successful Bosnian football managers, as its new manager on 11 June 2022.

Yugoslav Cup winners and Road to Europe
FK Velež Mostar were the only Bosnian side that appeared 4 times in the Yugoslav Cup Grand Final, having won 2; an 1981 and 1986 Yugoslav cup; and lost 2.

1980–81 Yugoslav Cup Final:

1985–86 Yugoslav Cup Final:

1988–89 Yugoslav Cup Final:

1957–58 Yugoslav Cup Final:

In the 1974–75 season, Velež reached Cup UEFA quarter finals.  In the earlier rounds of the UEFA Cup, Velež eliminated Spartak Moscow, by losing in Russia 3–1 and winning in Mostar 2–0. Velež then eliminated Rapid Vienna, by drawing in Vienna 1–1, and winning in Mostar 1–0. Velež then eliminated Derby County of England by beating them 3–1 in England and 4–1 in Mostar.  Velež was finally defeated in the quarter finals by Dutch team Twente by winning 1–0 in Mostar, but losing 2–0 in the Netherlands 2–0. Overall, a successful year for the Mostar Reds.
Twente then went on to beat Italian giants Juventus 3–1, 1–0 to reach the UEFA Cup Finals and face Borussia Mönchengladbach (0–0, 5–1).

In the 1987–88 season, Velež once again did well in the UEFA Cup. In the first round Velež eliminated FC Sion from Switzerland. In Mostar, Velež came away with an easy win 5–0, while in the second leg they were beaten 0–3. In the second round Velež drew Borussia Dortmund from Germany, in the first leg Dortmund defeated Velež 2–0, while in the return leg Velež won 2–1, which was not enough to go through.

In the 1988–89 season, Velež once again did well in the UEFA Cup, this time falling short of qualifying for the quarter finals.  First, Velež eliminated Apoel from Cyprus (1–0, 5–2). Then Velež defeated FC Os. Belenense from Portugal in dramatic penalty shootouts (5–4). In the third round Velež faced Heart of Midlothian of Edinburgh, Scotland, where Velež was defeated 3–0 in Edinburgh, while in Mostar Velež won 2–1, which was not enough to go through.

UEFA Team rankings
Since the late 1970s up until the Bosnian War of 1992–1995, Velež has been consistently ranked on the UEFA Team Rankings. While the club has often reached ranks of top 100–200 teams, on some occasions the UEFA has ranked Velež among the top 100 teams. In 1989 Velež was ranked at the 43rd place on the UEFA Team Ranking List which also marks the highest UEFA ranking achieved by any football club from Bosnia and Herzegovina.

In 1988, Velež was ranked 88th on the UEFA's Team Ranking List, ahead of clubs like Everton (ranked 100), Olympique Marseille (ranked 115), Espanyol (ranked 121), Napoli (ranked 125), Young Boys (ranked 126), Dinamo Zagreb and Borussia Dortmund (ranked 158), Aston Villa (ranked 200) and many others, as cited in the UEFA Team Ranking database for 1988.
In 1989, Velež was ranked 43rd on the UEFA's Team Ranking List, ahead of clubs like Hamburger SV (ranked 45), AC Milan (ranked 51), CSKA Sofia (ranked 57), Napoli (ranked 62), Dinamo Moscow (ranked 67), AS Roma (ranked 74), Real Sociedad (ranked 80), AEK Athens (ranked 105), FC Nantes (ranked 121), Manchester United (ranked 126), Tottenham Hotspur (ranked 141), Paris Saint-Germain (143), Dinamo Zagreb (195) and many others, as cited in the UEFA Team Ranking database for 1989.
*The highest UEFA ranking achieved by any football club from Bosnia and Herzegovina.

In 1990, Velež was ranked 51st on the UEFA's Team Ranking List, ahead of clubs like VfB Stuttgart (ranked 55), Hamburger SV (ranked 56), AS Monaco (ranked 60), AEK Athens (ranked 73), Real Sociedad (ranked 79), Levski Sofia (ranked 92), Borussia Dortmund (ranked 94), Lech Poznan (ranked 100), Paris Saint Germain (ranked 139), Dinamo Zagreb (192) and many others, as cited in the UEFA Team Ranking database for 1990.
In 1991, Velež was ranked 53rd on the UEFA's Team Ranking List, ahead of clubs like AS Roma (ranked 55), AS Monaco (ranked 57), Fiorentina (ranked 80), Valencia (ranked 86), Manchester United (ranked 92), Young Boys (ranked 103), Dinamo Zagreb (105), Espanyol (ranked 111), Sevilla (ranked 147), Sturm Graz (ranked 206) and many others, as cited in the UEFA Team Ranking database for 1991.
In 1992, when the war started and when Mostar was being bombed and under siege, Velež was even then still ranked 81st club on the UEFA's Team Ranking List, still ahead of clubs like Dinamo Moscow (ranked 85), Torino (ranked 99), Espanyol (ranked 107), Aston Villa (ranked 111), Sevilla (ranked 147) and many others, as cited in the UEFA Team Ranking database for 1992.

Rivalry

FK Velež's main rival is HŠK Zrinjski Mostar, the other team from Mostar. The match between the two Mostar teams is called the Mostar derby. The first match between Velež Mostar and Zrinjski was played during the 1920s, but when Zrinjski was banned (from 1945 to 1992) for playing in the fascist league during World War II, the rivalry stopped. During Velež's glory days in the Yugoslav First League, they were the only major club from Mostar and were supported by all people from the city of Mostar. After the war Zrinjski was reformed, and they became a symbol of the Croatian side of Mostar (west side) and Velež become a symbol of the Bosniak side (east side). On 1 March 2000, Zrinjski and Velež played a friendly game, for the first time after Zrinjski was reformed. The game was played in Sarajevo and the result was a 2–2 draw. The first official league game was played on 18 August 2000 at the Bijeli Brijeg Stadium. Zrinjski won 2–0.

The rivalry is both local and ethnic. FK Velež and their fans, called Red Army are predominantly Bosniaks, while Zrinjski and their fans called Ultras are Croats. Making the rivalry bigger is the fact that Zrinjski stadium was Velež's stadium during their glory days in Yugoslavia, but because of the war, Velež was forced to move from their stadium, which was located in the western part of Mostar, and build a new stadium on the other side of the city.

Supporters

Velež supporters are famous for their loyalty and passion, and they follow their club wherever it plays. There are few groups of Velež supporters. The most famous are Red Army Mostar and Mostarski Rođeni.

Honours

Domestic

League
Yugoslav First League:
Runners-up (3): 1972–73, 1973–74, 1986–87
Third place (4): 1965–66, 1969–70, 1985–86, 1987–88
Yugoslav Second League:
Winners (2): 1952, 1954–55

 Premier League of Bosnia and Herzegovina:
 Third place (1): 2020–21

First League of the Federation of Bosnia and Herzegovina:
Winners (2): 2005–06, 2018–19
Runners-up (2): 2003–04, 2004–05

Cups
Yugoslav Cup:
Winners (2): 1980–81, 1985–86
Runners-up (2): 1957–58, 1988–89
Bosnia and Herzegovina Cup: 
Winners (1): 2021–22

European
Mitropa Cup:
Runners-up (1): 1975–76
Balkans Cup:
Winners (1): 1980–81
UEFA Cup:
Quarter-finals (1): 1974–75

Recent seasons

European record

Summary

(This summary does not include matches played in the Inter-Cities Fairs Cup, which was not endorsed by UEFA and is not counted in UEFA's official European statistics.)

Pld = Matches played; W = Matches won; D = Matches drawn; L = Matches lost; GF = Goals for; GA = Goals against

By season
(Velež score always listed first. Source:)

European campaigns – Finals achievements

Player records
Most appearances in UEFA club competitions: 14 appearances:
Vukašin Petranović
Mili Hadžiabdić
Vladimir Gudelj
Top scorer in UEFA club competitions: 10 goals – Semir Tuce

Players

Current squad

Players with multiple nationalities

  Slaviša Bogdanović
  Alen Dejanović
  Saša Domić
  Osman Hadžikić
  Marko Karamarko
  Ardonis Mućaj
  Elvir Muminović
  Antonio Pavić
  Lejs Pličanić

Out on loan

Club officials

Coaching staff

|-
 
|-
 
|-
 
|-
 
|-
 
|-
 
|-
 
|-
 
|-

Other information

Managerial history

 Bernard Hügl (1953–55)
 Ratomir Čabrić (1955–59)
 Gustav Lechner (1959–60)
 Ratomir Čabrić (1960–61)
 Haldun Leo Hrvić (1961–64)
 D. Filipović (1964–65)
 Domagoj Kapetanović (1965–66)
 Mirko Kokotović (1966–67)
 Haldun Leo Hrvić (1967–68)
 Sulejman Rebac (1968–76)
 Muhamed Mujić (1976–77)
 Vukašin Višnjevac (1977–80)
 Miloš Milutinović (1980–82)
 Muhamed Mujić (1982–83)
 Dušan Bajević (1983–87)
 Enver Marić (1987–90)
 Franjo Džidić (1990–92)
 Zejnil Selimotić (1994–96)
 Sedin Tanović (1996–98)
 Avdo Kalajdžić (1998–00)
 Kemal Hafizović (2002–03) 
 Avdo Kalajdžić (2003)
 Husnija Arapović (2003–05)
 Kemal Hafizović (2005)
 Milomir Šešlija (2005–07)
 Anel Karabeg (2007–08)
 Emir Tufek (2008)
 Abdulah Ibraković (2008–10)
 Veselin Đurasović (interim) (2010)
 Demir Hotić (2010)
 Enes Spahić (interim) (2010)
 Milomir Odović (2011)
 Mirza Varešanović (2011–12)
 Adnan Dizdarević (interim) (2012)
 Asmir Džafić (2012)
 Ibrahim Rahimić (2012–13)
 Nedim Jusufbegović (2013–15)
 Dželaludin Muharemović (2015)
 Adis Obad (interim) (2015)
 Dženan Zaimović (interim) (2015)
 Dragi Kanatlarovski (2015)
 Dženan Zaimović (interim) (2015)
 Zijo Tojaga (2015–16)
 Avdo Kalajdžić (2016)
 Ibrahim Rahimić (2016–19)
 Feđa Dudić (2019–22)
 Amar Osim (2022)
 Nedim Jusufbegović (2022–present)

Songs
The official anthem of FK Velež Mostar is Rođeni, Rođeni by Željko Samardžić. The text was written by Milenko Mišo Marić. The music was composed by Kemal Monteno. The first demo recording was done after the Marshall Tito Yugoslav Cup final in 1981 against FK Željezničar Sarajevo. For the first time, the official club anthem was played before the final of the Marshall Tito Yugoslav Cup in 1986 against GNK Dinamo Zagreb. It was also played live at the Bijeli Brijeg Stadium by Željko Samardžić in 1987 before the Uefa cup game against Borussia Dortmund. The official anthem of the club's ultras group Red Army Mostar is Ili grmi il' se zemlja trese by MO Selection Band. Later, a band called Red Army Band recorded seven songs that quickly became popular among Velež fans. Other artists did the same too, so today there are a lot of recorded songs about the red club from Mostar.

References

External links

FK Velež Mostar Official website 
FK Velež Mostar at UEFA.com 
FK Velež Mostar at N/FSBiH 
UG Mostarski Rođeni  
KN Red Army Mostar 
Rođeni.com 

 
Association football clubs established in 1922
Football clubs in Bosnia and Herzegovina
Football clubs in Yugoslavia
Sport in Mostar
1922 establishments in Bosnia and Herzegovina